Javier Martín Tenemás Gutiérrez (born July 19, 1985 in Ica) is a Peruvian footballer who plays as a right back.

Club career
Tenemás has previously played for Alianza Lima, Total Chalaco, Inti Gas Deportes, Club Juan Aurich, Alianza Atlético and Univ. César Vallejo.

International career
While playing for Atlético Universidad, he made his debut for the Peruvian national team
on May 22, 2005 in the 2005 Kirin Cup against Japan. He was given his debut by former manager Freddy Ternero and was later substituted by Miguel Cevasco in the 61st minute of the match, which finished in a 1-0 victory for Peru.

References

External links

1985 births
Living people
Footballers from Lima
Association football fullbacks
Peruvian footballers
Peru international footballers
Peruvian Primera División players
Club Alianza Lima footballers
Atlético Universidad footballers
Alianza Atlético footballers
Total Chalaco footballers
Ayacucho FC footballers
Juan Aurich footballers
Club Deportivo Universidad César Vallejo footballers
Cerro Porteño (Presidente Franco) footballers
Peruvian expatriate footballers
Expatriate footballers in Paraguay